Amp rack is short for amplifier rack, and is a term used mostly in reference to professional audio applications to describe any furniture, fixture, or case where amplifiers are mounted by their faceplates or in slot grooves, which is termed a rack mount.  

A 19-inch rack is the most common standardized frame or enclosure for mounting multiple electronic equipment. Each piece of equipment has a front panel that is 19 inches (48.3 cm) wide. The 19-inch dimension includes the edges, or "ears", that protrude on each side, which allow the amplifier or other electronic equipment to be fastened to the rack frame with screws.

Examples
Examples include use in recording studios, mobile DJ setups, or live stage events. Each of these instances could require more power or more output channels than a single amplifier could provide, but necessitate portability of all amplifiers at once.

Most professionally installed sound reinforcement systems in theaters, theme parks and themed retail establishments utilize the equipment rack as a means to organize their equipment for audio, video and communications in the venue.

Audio amplifiers